Krystyna (Krzysia) Drohojowska (later Ketling of Elgin) is a fictional character in the novel Fire in the Steppe by Henryk Sienkiewicz. She is a beautiful orphan who marries Hassling-Ketling of Elgin.

In Jerzy Hoffman's 1969 film adaptation, Krzysia is portrayed by Barbara Brylska.

Story
Krystyna is an orphan in the care of stolnik Makowiecki. In 1668 she arrives (together with Barbara Jeziorkowska) in Warsaw and meets Michał Wołodyjowski. He falls in love with her and proposes. Krystyna accepts his proposal, even though her feelings for him are platonic. Soon she meets Hassling-Ketling of Elgin, Wołodyjowski's friend. Krystyna and Ketling quickly fall in love, but since she is already engaged, they can't be together. Krzysia decides then to enter a convent, but Wołodyjowski gives up Krystyna to his friend, wanting them both to be happy.

After they marry, Krystyna and Ketling live in Courland. They have one son. In 1672 Ketling goes to Kamianets-Podilskyi which was to be attacked by Turks. Krzysia accompanies him. After the city surrenders, Ketling refuses to surrender and commits suicide, together with his friend Wołodyjowski, by blowing themselves up in a gunpowder depot.

Description
Krystyna is a young and very beautiful woman.  She is tall and slender. She's got black hair, big blue eyes and pale complexion. She is a shy and passive but honest person. When she realized her love for Ketling, she feels guilty. She prefers to become a nun rather than marry unloved Wołodyjowski. At the end of the novel, she shows up to be very brave, she decides not to leave Ketling even during the war with Turks.

References

Characters in novels of the 19th century
Fictional Polish people
Literary characters introduced in 1888
Orphan characters in literature
Sienkiewicz's Trilogy
Fictional people from the 17th-century